Conus telatus, common name the Philippine cone, is a species of sea snail, a marine gastropod mollusk in the family Conidae, the cone snails and their allies.

Like all species within the genus Conus, these snails are predatory and venomous. They are capable of "stinging" humans, therefore live ones should be handled carefully or not at all.

Description
The size of the shell varies between 45 mm and 100 mm. Its appearance is almost similar to Conus textile Linnaeus, 1758 but the triangular reticulations are much finer than in the type. The usual three bands are each divided into two, with narrow intervening spaces.

Distribution
This marine species occurs off the Southern Philippines.

References

 Filmer R.M. (2001). A Catalogue of Nomenclature and Taxonomy in the Living Conidae 1758 - 1998. Backhuys Publishers, Leiden. 388pp
 Tucker J.K. (2009). Recent cone species database. September 4, 2009 Edition.
 Tucker J.K. & Tenorio M.J. (2009) Systematic classification of Recent and fossil conoidean gastropods. Hackenheim: Conchbooks. 296 pp.
 Poppe G.T., Monnier E. & Tagaro S.P. (2012) New Conidae from the central Philippines. Visaya 3(5): 47–56. [March 2012]
 Puillandre N., Duda T.F., Meyer C., Olivera B.M. & Bouchet P. (2015). One, four or 100 genera? A new classification of the cone snails. Journal of Molluscan Studies. 81: 1-23

External links
 The Conus Biodiversity website
 Cone Shells - Knights of the Sea
 

telatus
Gastropods described in 1848